Clarence Chauncey Gilhams (April 11, 1860 – June 5, 1912) was an American educator and politician who served two terms as a U.S. Representative from Indiana from 1906 to 1909.

Biography 
Born in Brighton, Indiana, Gilhams attended the common local schools and Indiana State University at Terre Haute, Indiana and became a school teacher. He was employed as a salesman. An auditor of Lagrange County in 1894–1902, he later engaged in the life insurance business.

Congress 
Gilhams was elected as a Republican, in 1906, to the Fifty-ninth Congress to fill the vacancy caused by the resignation of Newton W. Gilbert; he was reelected to the Sixtieth Congress and served from November 6, 1906, to March 3, 1909.
He was an unsuccessful candidate for reelection in 1908 to the Sixty-first Congress.

Later career and death 
Later, he studied law, and was admitted to the bar in 1910, also resuming the life insurance business.

He died in Lagrange, Indiana, on June 5, 1912.
He was interred in Greenwood Cemetery.

References

1860 births
1912 deaths
People from LaGrange County, Indiana
Republican Party members of the United States House of Representatives from Indiana
19th-century American politicians
Indiana State University alumni